Ginshachia gemmifera is a moth of the family Notodontidae. It is found in India.

References

External links
 - with images

Notodontidae